Markus Scherer (born 20 June 1962 in Ludwigshafen am Rhein) is a German former wrestler who competed in the 1984 Summer Olympics and in the 1988 Summer Olympics.

References

External links
 

1962 births
Living people
Olympic wrestlers of West Germany
Wrestlers at the 1984 Summer Olympics
Wrestlers at the 1988 Summer Olympics
German male sport wrestlers
Olympic silver medalists for West Germany
Olympic medalists in wrestling
Medalists at the 1984 Summer Olympics
20th-century German people
21st-century German people